Santo Amaro das Brotas is a municipality located in the Brazilian state of Sergipe. Its population was 12,151 (2020) and its area is 235 km².

References

Municipalities in Sergipe